Truxalis nasuta is a species of short-horned grasshopper in the family Acrididae. It is found in Africa, Europe, and Asia.

References

External links

 

Acridinae